Cylindera eoa is a species of ground beetle of the subfamily Cicindelinae. It was described by W. Horn in 1898 and is endemic to the Philippines.

References

eoa
Beetles described in 1898
Taxa named by Walther Horn
Endemic fauna of the Philippines